Elit is a village in western Eritrea approximately 30 km north-east of Teseney.

Nearby towns and villages include Bitama, Algheden,, Antalla and Adendema.

Villages in Eritrea